(2Z,6Z)-farnesyl diphosphate lyase may refer to:
 (+)-alpha-santalene synthase ((2Z,6Z)-farnesyl diphosphate cyclizing), an enzyme
 (+)-endo-beta-bergamotene synthase ((2Z,6Z)-farnesyl diphosphate cyclizing), an enzyme
 (-)-endo-alpha-bergamotene synthase ((2Z,6Z)-farnesyl diphosphate cyclizing), an enzyme